Aureispira maritima  is a bacterium from the genus of Aureispira which has been isolated from barnacle debris.

References

External links
Type strain of Aureispira maritima at BacDive -  the Bacterial Diversity Metadatabase

Bacteroidota
Bacteria described in 2007